Karl Gerhart "Gert" Fröbe (25 February 1913 – 5 September 1988) was a German actor. He was best known in English-speaking countries for his work as Auric Goldfinger in the James Bond film Goldfinger, as Peachum in The Threepenny Opera, as Baron Bomburst in Chitty Chitty Bang Bang, as Hotzenplotz in Der Räuber Hotzenplotz,  General Dietrich von Choltitz in Is Paris Burning? and Colonel Manfred von Holstein in Those Magnificent Men in Their Flying Machines.

Early life and education 
Fröbe was born in Oberplanitz, today part of Zwickau. He was initially a violinist, but he abandoned it for Kabarett and theatre work.

He joined the Nazi Party in 1929 at the age of 16 and left in 1937.

In September 1944, theatres in Germany were closed down and Fröbe was drafted into the German Army, where he served until the end of the war.

After his party membership became known after World War II, Israel banned Fröbe's films until Mario Blumenau, a Jewish survivor, revealed just eight weeks later that his life and his mother's were probably saved when Fröbe hid them from the Nazis.

Career 
Fröbe gained fame in one of the first German films made after the Second World War, called Berliner Ballade (The Ballad of Berlin, 1948). His character's name, "Otto Normalverbraucher" ( Otto Average Consumer), became the German term equivalent to "Average Joe".

He was cast as the villain in the Swiss-West German-Spanish film Es geschah am hellichten Tag (It Happened in Broad Daylight, 1958), with the original screenplay written by Friedrich Dürrenmatt. His role as a serial killer of children drew the attention of the producers of the James Bond movie Goldfinger (1964) and he was chosen to play one of the best remembered villains of the series, gold tycoon Auric Goldfinger. He later remarked, "The ridiculous thing is that since I played Goldfinger in the James Bond film there are some people who still insist on seeing me as a cold, ruthless villain – a man without laughs." 

Fröbe made several appearances in all-star casts in the 1960s, including the films The Longest Day (1962), Those Magnificent Men in Their Flying Machines (1965), Is Paris Burning? (1966),Triple Cross (1966), Chitty Chitty Bang Bang (1968), and Monte Carlo or Bust (1969).

During the 1980s, Fröbe played small parts in Mercedes Benz W123 commercials, helping to promote the coupé and the sedan.

Death 
Fröbe died in Munich in September 1988 at age 75 from a heart attack. He was buried at the Waldfriedhof cemetery in Icking.

Filmography

Notes

References

External links 

!colspan="3" style="background:#C1D8FF;"| James Bond
|-

 
 

1913 births
1988 deaths
20th-century German male actors
Commanders Crosses of the Order of Merit of the Federal Republic of Germany
German Army personnel of World War II
German male film actors
German male television actors
German resistance members
Nazi Party members
People from Zwickau
People who rescued Jews during the Holocaust
Deaths from coronary thrombosis